Two ships of the French Navy have borne the name America, honouring the links between France and the United States of America:

See also 
 
 
 

Sources 
 L’America, premier vaisseau de la marine américaine, Nicolas Mioque

America